The Egyptian Reform Party is a Salafi political party.  The party is made up mostly of young Salafis. A spokesperson for the party, named Essam Abdel Baset, has stated that the party will rely on scholars from Al Azhar and not Salafi sheiks. The party was at one point part of the Democratic Alliance for Egypt.

References

2011 establishments in Egypt
Islamic political parties in Egypt
Political parties established in 2011
Political parties in Egypt
Salafi groups